The 2017 Sun Bowl was a postseason college football bowl game played at Sun Bowl Stadium in El Paso, Texas, on December 29, 2017. The game was the 84th Sun Bowl and featured the NC State Wolfpack of the Atlantic Coast Conference and the Arizona State Sun Devils of the Pac-12 Conference. It was one of the 2017–18 bowl games concluding the 2017 FBS football season. Sponsored by Hyundai Motor America, the game was officially known as the Hyundai Sun Bowl.

After taking a 28–10 lead at the half, NC State defeated Arizona State by a 52–31 final score. Nyheim Hines of NC State was selected as the game MVP. His teammates Kentavius Street and Kyle Bambard were named the most valuable lineman and most valuable special teams player, respectively.

Teams

NC State 

The NC State Wolfpack finished the 2017 regular season with an 8–4 record under Coach Dave Doeren; the most wins Doeren has had at his tenure at NC State to date. The game was the team's first appearance in the Sun Bowl, and their second straight bowl win. Shortly after at the NFL draft, the entire NC State defensive line was selected in the first four rounds along with their running back, Nyheim Hines. Coach Doeren was offered a contract extension which locked in his role for another 6 years shortly after the game.

Arizona State 

The Arizona State Sun Devils finished the 2017 regular season with a 7–5 record. The game was the team's sixth appearance in the Sun Bowl.

Game summary

Scoring summary

Source

Statistics

References

2017–18 NCAA football bowl games
Sun Bowl
Arizona State Sun Devils football bowl games
NC State Wolfpack football bowl games
2017 in sports in Texas
December 2017 sports events in the United States